Tung Wah Group of Hospitals Lo Kon Ting Memorial College is a Hong Kong secondary school. Completely funded by the Government of Hong Kong, the grammar school is one of the two secondary schools located in Long Ping Estate. Most of the school's subjects are taught in English, with few exceptions like Liberal Studies and Visual Arts. Established and governed by the Tung Wah Group of Hospitals, the oldest and largest charitable organisation in Hong Kong, the school had 24 classes, as of 2019.

History 
Initially named Tung Wah Group of Hospitals Number Fifteen School upon its establishment in 1987, the school is the fifteenth secondary school established by the Tung Wah Group of Hospitals. The school was then bestowed its current name from the Tung Wah Group of Hospitals after receiving a donation from family of Lo Kon-ting, a Jewellery company founder, under the name of Lo Wing Yip Tong.

Shortly after suffering a stroke, Yim Chin-ming, then-principal of the school, passed away on 11 May 2013. He was succeeded by Lam Chi-ming, then-vice-principal of Tung Wah Group of Hospitals Kap Yan Directors' College, in October 2013. Lam is the incumbent principal of the school.

Notable people 
 Richard Eng King-hang, a renowned cram school tutor, once served as a teacher in the school during early days of the school
 Ho Hoi-lam, an alumna of the school, scored 8 As, a level 5 in English and a 5* in Chinese in 2007 Hong Kong Certificate of Education Examination. Her examination result was lauded by major media outlets of Hong Kong.

See also 
 Tung Wah Group of Hospitals
 Education in Hong Kong
 List of secondary schools in Hong Kong
 Lists of schools in Hong Kong

References

External links 

 Tung Wah Group of Hospitals Lo Kon Ting Memorial College
 Tung Wah Group of Hospitals

Lo Kon Ting Memorial College
Lo Kon Ting Memorial College
Educational institutions established in 1987
Secondary schools in Hong Kong
1987 establishments in Hong Kong
Yuen Long